University of Upper Alsace (UHA) is a multidisciplinary teaching and research centre based in the two cities of Mulhouse and Colmar, France. Research and teaching at UHA concentrates mainly on science, technology, economics, management, arts and humanities. In 2017, UHA has more than 8000 students with about a hundred courses offered. The founding of UHA was driven by social and business players, among them was Jean-Baptiste Donnet.

The special geographical situation of UHA, which lies close to the Swiss and German borders, is favourable to the emergence of single courses leading to double or triple degrees that are recognized in the neighbouring countries. Together with Albert Ludwigs University of Freiburg, University of Basel, Karlsruhe Institute of Technology, as well as Strasbourg University, the university of Upper Alsace is a member of the EUCOR, which is a trinational cross-border alliance of five universities on the Upper Rhine in the border region between Germany, France and Switzerland.

History

Departments
The university consists of  five faculties:
FLSH - Faculte des Lettres, Langues et Sciences Humaines 
FSESJ - Faculte des Sciences Economiques, Sociales et Juridiques 
FST - Faculte des Sciences et Techniques
PEPS - Pluridisciplinaire d'Enseignement Professionnalisé Supérieur
FMA - Faculte de Marketing et Agrosciences
two institutes of technology:

 IUT DE COLMAR - Institut Universitaire de Technologie de Colmar 
 IUT DE MULHOUSE - Institut Universitaire de Technologie de Mulhouse 
and two schools of engineering:
ENSCMu - Ecole Nationale Superieure de Chimie de Mulhouse
ENSISA - Ecole Nationale Superieure d'Ingénieurs Sud Alsace (Merger in 2006 between ENSITM and ESSAIM)

Notable people
Faculty
 Bernard Heyberger (born 1954) - specialist in the history of Middle Eastern Christianity
 Jennifer K Dick (born 1970) - American poet, translator and educator/scholar 

Alumni
 Mehmet Çekiç (born 1970) - Turkish Paralympic alpine skier

See also
 Upper Alsace

References

 
Educational institutions established in 1975
Universities in Grand Est
Education in Mulhouse
Buildings and structures in Mulhouse
Education in Colmar
Buildings and structures in Colmar